Parvati Assembly constituency is one of the 288 Vidhan Sabha (legislative assembly) constituencies of Maharashtra state, western India. This constituency is located in Pune district. It is part of Pune (Lok Sabha constituency).

Geographical scope
The constituency comprises ward nos. 27 to 30, 32 to 40, 42, 86 to 90 & 150 of Pune Municipal Corporation (PMC).

Members of Legislative Assembly

Election Result

References

Assembly constituencies of Pune district
Assembly constituencies of Maharashtra